The 2009 Eastern Congo offensive was a joint Congo-Rwanda military offensive against the Hutu FDLR rebel group descended from those groups that carried out the 1994 Rwanda genocide. Two operations were carried out, 'Kimia II' and 'Umoja Wetu.' 'Kimia' can be translated as 'calm.' "Umoja Wetu" is Swahili for "Our Unity".

Timeline 
Rwanda and the DRC made an agreement to rout out elements of the FDLR from eastern Congo. On 20 January 2009, 1,000 Rwandan soldiers poured over the border into eastern Congo near Goma and were working, according to United Nations officials, as advisers for the Congolese troops.

On 23 January 2009, some rebels had started to surrender to Rwandan and Congolese troops.

First reports of fighting came on 24 January 2009, when the Congolese army reported they killed nine FDLR militiamen. In response the rebels claimed they didn't lose any men and that the Congolese military itself suffered nine soldiers killed and one wounded in a clash with a group of Mai-Mai militiamen. By this time the FDLR was in retreat from Southern into Northern Kivu province and the number of Rwandan soldiers in the region reached 5,000.

On 26 January 2009, rebels tried to retake the village of Kasinga, but were repulsed by Congolese and Rwandan soldiers in fighting that killed four militiamen.

On 18 February 2009, air strikes killed 40 rebels 5 kilometers west of Goma.

Rwandan forces withdrew on 27 February 2009.

References

Eastern Congo Offensive
Eastern Congo Offensive, 2009
Wars involving the Democratic Republic of the Congo
Civil wars involving the states and peoples of Africa
Wars involving Rwanda
Democratic Republic of the Congo–Rwanda relations
Kivu conflict